States of Germany may refer to:

 List of states in the Holy Roman Empire, the states of the Holy Roman Empire between 962 and 1806
 States of the German Confederation, member states of the German Confederation between 1815 and 1866
 States of the German Empire (1871–1918)
 States of the Weimar Republic
 Administrative divisions of East Germany
 States of Germany, Bundesländer or Länder, the modern states of Germany